Donald A. Smiley is the President and Chief Executive Officer of Summerfest and former Major League Baseball executive. He served as president of the Florida Marlins from 1994 to 1998, taking over after the death of Carl Barger. He is a graduate of University of Wisconsin–Oshkosh

Career 
After graduating from college, Smiley worked at WFRV-TV in Green Bay first as a cameraman and then as an assignment reporter. He went on to work as district sales manager for Hoffmaster Paper Company in Oshkosh from 1979 until 1982 when he left to become the director of marketing for the Honda Classic PGA Tournament in Florida in 1982.

Florida Marlins 
In 1991, Smiley became the vice president and chief spokesman for South Florida Big League Baseball during which he helped secure the expansion Florida Marlins. He served as president of the Marlins from 1994 to 2000. The owner of the Florida Marlins at the time, Wayne Huizenga, tried to arrange a sale of the Marlins to Smiley for $169 million in 1997.

Summerfest 
Smiley was hired in 2004 as the CEO of Summerfest, an annual music festival held at the Henry Maier Festival Park along the lakefront in Milwaukee, Wisconsin. In 2012, Smiley's compensation as Summerfest CEO was $886,185 according to Milwaukee World Festival.

References

External links

Living people
Florida Marlins executives
Major League Baseball team presidents
University of Wisconsin–Oshkosh alumni
1955 births